"The Blower's Daughter" is the debut single by Irish musician Damien Rice, released on 21 September 2001 through 14th Floor Records. It was released as the lead single for Rice's debut studio album O. It was written and produced by Rice and features vocals by Lisa Hannigan. 

The song have been covered by various artists such as American singer Matt McAndrew, who performed the song at the talent show The Voice, as well as Brazilian musicians Ana Carolina and Seu Jorge, who made a Portuguese language version of the song titled "É Isso Aí".

Background and composition
The meaning of the song has been greatly speculated due to Rice not giving many interviews to promote the album explaining the lyrics. One popular interpretation of the song talks about the story of the daughter of a clarinet teacher while another is related to a fictional story that Rice told at concerts about him having a conversation with a woman while working at a call center. It has also been speculated that the song is inspired by Lisa Hannigan, who features in the song and was in a relationship with Rice until 2007.

Called an "intense folky ballad", the song is played in E minor at a tempo of 66 beats per minute. Rice's vocals span from B3 to A♯5 in the song.

Release and commercial performance
The song was first released on 21 September 2001, exclusively in Ireland, as the first single for Rice's debut album O, set to be released the following year. The song debuted on the Irish Singles Chart at number 38, leaving the chart the next week. In 2004, after Rice was signed under Warner Music, "The Blower's Daughter" was released as a single to different European countries, achieving moderate success. 

Three years after its first release, the single entered the UK Singles Chart on 25 December 2004. It peaked at number 27 and remained in the chart for five weeks. On 4 November 2013, the song entered the ARIA Top 100 Singles Chart at the 82nd position while on 7 March 2015, it entered the French Singles Chart placing at number 93, becoming Rice's first and only song to chart in any of the two countries.

Usage in other media
The song has been extensively used in various films and television series. Namely, it was featured in the trailer of the 2004 drama film Closer, directed by Mike Nichols, as well as in the film itself. It has also been featured in the American television series The L Word, the Italian film The Caiman, and the German television series Polizeiruf 110, among others. Additionally, it was performed by dancer Travis Wall on the second season of the American dance competition show So You Think You Can Dance.

Cover versions
Several cover versions of the song have been performed in different television programs around the world. In 2013, Australian singer Taylor Henderson covered the song for the final episode of the fifth season of The X Factor Australia. His cover peaked at number 43 at the ARIA Top 100 Singles Chart while the original version charted the same week at number 82. In 2014, American singer-songwriter Matt McAndrew performed the song for the Live Top 8 episode on the seventh season of the American talent show The Voice. His version had opening sales of 92,000 downloads and peaked at number 40 on the Billboard Hot 100. The performance led the original version to appear on the Hot Rock & Alternative Songs at number 15. The song was also performed by Nadeem Leigh in 2013 on the second season of The Voice UK and by Joe Moore in 2015 on the fouth season of The Voice Australia.

Brazilian singer Simone made a Portuguese-language version of the song titled "Então Me Diz…", adapted by Zélia Duncan, for her 2005 live album Simone ao Vivo. The song peaked at number 45 in Brazil according to the Crowley Broadcast Analysis, and was featured in the Brazilian telenovela Belíssima. Mexican singer Kalimba included a Spanish-language version of the song under the name "No Puedo Dejarte de Amar" in his 2006 album NegroKlaro, the track features Jesús Navarro from the band Reik.

Credits and personnel
Personnel
 Lead vocals, guitar, bass, clarinet, drums, recording – Damien Rice
 Lead vocals – Lisa Hannigan
 Cello – Vyvienne Long
 Mastering – Robyn Robins

Charts

Certifications

Ana Carolina and Seu Jorge version

"É Isso Aí" is a single by Brazilian musicians Ana Carolina and Seu Jorge, released on 28 November 2005 through Sony BMG and Som Livre. It is the lead single from their 2006 live album Ana & Jorge: Ao Vivo. The lyrics were adapted to Portuguese by Ana Carolina.

The single was commercially successful topping the chart in Brazil and peaking at number 8 in Portugal. At the 2006 Multishow Brazilian Music Award, it was nominated for Best Song while at the 2006 Troféu Imprensa it tied for Best Song with "Quando a Chuva Passar" by Ivete Sangalo.

As of 2023, the music video for the song has over 130 million views.

Charts

References

2001 songs
2001 debut singles
Songs written by Damien Rice
Damien Rice songs
Ana Carolina songs
Seu Jorge songs
14th Floor Records singles
Sony BMG singles
Som Livre singles